Hatakeswara is a form of the Lord Shiva worshipped by the cult of Lingayat or Veera Pashupatha. There is a temple dedicated to Hatakeswara in Srisailam and many more across the Deccan region of India

Other Legends 
According to the Skanda Purana the Suryavanshi King Dashratha, who was the ruler of Ayodhya had performed a long penance to Lord Vishnu for obtaining heirs. He began his penance by visiting many pilgrim spots in the region of Kartikeyapura starting with Hatakeswara. The site was selected by him because his father Aja had also performed penance at the same spot earlier to appease the goddess and obtained certain Siddhis. After finishing his pilgrimage Dashratha created a massive temple for Lord Vishnu at Hatakeswara and installed an idol of the Lord in it.

In the hundred and second chapter of the text, there is also a mention of Lord Rama visiting Vibhishana to bid him goodbye before leaving the earth after Lakshmana had already attained Samadhi. On his way back, the Pushpaka Vimana refused to move ahead till Lord Rama got out of it and visited the shrine consecrated by his father. After taking bath in the pond in front of the temple, Rama installed a Shiva Linga in memory of his brother Lakshmana and also another one in memory of his wife Sita. Thereafter, he spent a few days at the pilgrim spot of his ancestors and then headed back to Ayodhya.

References

Forms of Shiva
Veerashaiva